The 2012–13 season of the Women's 2nd Fußball-Bundesliga was the ninth season of Germany's second-tier women's football league.

BV Cloppenburg and 1899 Hoffenheim gained promotion to the 2013–14 Fußball-Bundesliga (women) season, by respectively winning the North and South groups. 1. FFC Recklinghausen and BW Hohen Neuendorf played each other as they finished in the tenth position from each groups, for the playoff match to determine the fifth team that was relegated.

Final standings

North

South

Relegation play-off
Blau-Weiß Hohen Neuendorf won the play-off 6–3 on aggregate and remained in the second division.

References

2012-13
Ger
Women2
2